Twelve ships of the Royal Navy have borne the name HMS Martin

 was a ship captured in 1651 and sold in 1653.
 was a ship launched in 1652 and sold in 1667.
 was a 10-gun ketch launched in 1694 and captured by the French in 1702.
 was a 14-gun sloop launched in 1761 and sold in 1784.
 was a 16-gun sloop launched in 1790. She foundered in 1800.
 was an 18-gun sloop launched in 1805. She foundered in 1806.
 was an 18-gun sloop launched in 1809 and wrecked in 1817.
 was an 18-gun sloop launched in 1821. She foundered in 1826.
 was a 16-gun brig launched in 1850. She was used as a training brig from 1880 and was renamed HMS Kingfisher. She was sold in 1907.

 was a training brig, built as HMS Mayflower, but renamed in 1888 before being launched in 1890. She was used as coal hulk from 1907, being renamed C23.
 was an  launched in 1910 and sold in 1920.
 was an M-class destroyer launched in 1940 and sunk in 1942.

See also
 was a ship purchased in 1470 and listed until 1485.

Royal Navy ship names